Leighton Priestley (born 18 January 1951) is a Jamaican sprinter. He competed in the 400 metres at the 1972 Summer Olympics and the 1976 Summer Olympics.

References

1951 births
Living people
Athletes (track and field) at the 1972 Summer Olympics
Athletes (track and field) at the 1976 Summer Olympics
Jamaican male sprinters
Olympic athletes of Jamaica
Pan American Games silver medalists for Jamaica
Pan American Games medalists in athletics (track and field)
Athletes (track and field) at the 1970 British Commonwealth Games
Athletes (track and field) at the 1971 Pan American Games
Place of birth missing (living people)
Medalists at the 1971 Pan American Games
Commonwealth Games competitors for Jamaica